Tall Tales and Short Tempers is an album recorded by Jim Reeves and released in 1961 on the RCA Victor label (catalog no. LPM-2284). Chet Atkins was the producer.

In Billboard magazine's annual poll of country and western disc jockeys, it was ranked No. 6 among the "Favorite C&W Albums" of 1961.

The album's opening track, "The Blizzard", reached No. 4 on the Billboard country and western chart in March 1961.

Track listing
Side A
 "The Blizzard" (Howard) [3:22]
 "The Streets of Laredo" (traditional) [3:05]
 "That Silver-Haired Daddy of Mine" (Autry, Long) [3:15]
 "Rodger Young" (Loesser) [3:21]
 "The Fool's Paradise" (Bond) [3:17]

Side B
 "It's Nothin' to Me" (Patterson) [2:21]
 "The Mighty Everglades" (Davis) [2:46]
 "Danny Boy" (Weatherly) [2:13]
 "The Letter Edged in Black" (Carter) [2:24]
 "The Tie That Binds" (traditional) [2:50]
 "The Wreck of the Number Nine" (Robison) [2:17]

References

1961 albums
Jim Reeves albums